Lie Lover Lie is the second album by The Blood Arm. It was released in 2006.

Release and reception
The album received mainly positive reviews. British newspaper The Guardian awarded the album full marks, describing it as "an alternative dancefloor gem". Jeff Terich of Treble called the album "ecstatic, extravagant rock `n' roll", praising the band's ability to "lay down some fuckin' hits" and declaring them "the band that is giving rock a much-needed kick in the pants". British music magazine NME were also quick to praise the band, noting their "absolutely spiffo corkers-to-hummers ratio".

In 2007, the band played on an NME sponsored Rock 'N' Roll Riot US Tour alongside The Hold Steady, Demander, Federale, 1990s and Art Brut.

Track listing

iTunes Deluxe Edition

Credits
Nathaniel Fregoso - Vocals
Zebastian Carlisle - Guitars
Dyan Valdes - Keyboards
Zachary Amos - Drums

Produced by The Blood Arm, Dave Newton

References
 

2006 albums
The Blood Arm albums